Hubert Indra (born 24 May 1957) is an Italian male decathlete, who has continued his career into masters athletics.

Biography
During his career at senior level in track & field, he got 13 caps in the Italy national athletics team (from 1977 to 1991), and he won a silver medal at the 1983 Mediterranean Games. He has won three times at the Italian Athletics Championships. and ranked in the top 60, at 29th place, on the IAAF world leading list at the end of the 1982 season, with his personal best that was also national record.

On 30 June 2007 in Milan he has sets the world record master M50 of decathlon with 7824 pts.

World records
Masters athletics
Decathlon M50: 7824 pts,  Milan, 30 June 2007, until 7 June 2014 when was broken by Jean-Luc Duez with 7897 pts

Note: Hurdles are 100 m and not 110 m as in Decathlon senior, Shot put (6.000 kg), Discus throw (1.500 kg), Javelin throw (700 g).

Personal best
Decathlon: 7617 pts,  Donnas, 19 August 1982

Note: Shot put (7.260 kg), 110 metres hurdles (1.067 m), Discus throw (2.000 kg), Javelin throw (800 g).

Achievements
Masters

National titles
Italian Athletics Championships
Decathlon: 1977, 1980, 1983

References

External links
 

1957 births
Living people
Italian decathletes
Italian masters athletes
World record setters in masters athletics
Mediterranean Games silver medalists for Italy
Mediterranean Games medalists in athletics
Athletes (track and field) at the 1983 Mediterranean Games
People from Tscherms
Sportspeople from Südtirol